The Hong Kong women's national baseball team represents Hong Kong in women's international baseball competitions. The team is a member of the Baseball Federation of Asia.

Baseball
Women's national baseball teams